Anticlea elegans, formerly Zigadenus elegans, is also known as mountain deathcamas, elegant camas or alkali grass. It is not a grass (though its leaves are grass-like), but belongs to the trillium family, Melanthiaceae.

It has white lily-like flowers and two-pronged, greenish-yellow glands on each petal (the shape of which can help in distinguishing it from other members of the genus).  It is widely distributed through western North America, but absent from California. In Canada its range extends from Quebec and New Brunswick to the Yukon Territory and into Alaska. Plants on the western side of the continent tend to be smaller in size than their eastern counterparts, but have more densely clustered flowers.  The plant is extremely poisonous.

Meriwether Lewis, while on the course of his expedition in 1806, collected a specimen near the Blackfoot River.

References

External links

Melanthiaceae
Flora of Northeastern Mexico
Flora of Western Canada
Flora of the Northwestern United States
Flora of the South-Central United States
Flora of Alaska
Flora of New Brunswick
Flora of Ontario
Flora of Quebec
Flora of Arizona
Flora of Iowa
Flora of Minnesota
Flora of Nebraska
Flora of Nevada
Flora of North Dakota
Flora of South Dakota
Flora of Utah
Flora of the Western United States
Flora of the Rocky Mountains
Plants described in 1903
Taxa named by Frederick Traugott Pursh
Flora without expected TNC conservation status